Hermann Burghart (7 April 1834, Türmitz – 23 January 1901, Vienna) was a Bohemian-born Austrian scenic designer and set decorator.

Life and work
Burghart studied at the Academy of Fine Arts, Vienna. In 1866, he was engaged as a set designer and decorative painter at the Vienna State Opera.

Later that same year, he was taken on as a partner at the theater decorating studio belonging to Carlo Brioschi and Johann Kautsky. The studio was subsequently named "Brioschi, Burghart und Kautsky, k.u.k. Hoftheatermaler in Wien". It employed dozens of carpenters and mechanics in addition to its artists. These included, at various times,  Georg Janny, Franz Poledne, Ferdinand Brunner and Alfons Mucha. They fulfilled orders throughout Germany and abroad. One of their regular customers was the Metropolitan Opera in New York. Notably, they provided sets for the Viennese premiere of Tristan und Isolde by Richard Wagner.

He also taught painting at his alma mater, the Vienna Academy. The illustrator and architectural painter,  was one of his most prominent students.

References

Further reading
 Robin Thurlow Lacy, "Burghart, Hermann", in: A biographical dictionary of scenographers. 500 B.C. to 1900 A.D., Greenwood Press, 1990, pg.94 
 Rudolf Schmidt, "Burghart, Hermann", in: Österreichisches Künstlerlexikon. Von den Anfängen bis zur Gegenwart, Vol.3, Tusch, 1974, pg.282 
 Hans Vollmer: "Burghart, Hermann". In: Ulrich Thieme (Ed.): Allgemeines Lexikon der Bildenden Künstler von der Antike bis zur Gegenwart, Vol.5: Brewer–Carlingen. E. A. Seemann, Leipzig 1911, pg.251 (Online)

External links

1834 births
1901 deaths
Austrian painters
Austrian scenic designers
Set decorators
Academy of Fine Arts Vienna alumni
Academic staff of the Academy of Fine Arts Vienna
German Bohemian people
People from Ústí nad Labem District